The 11th Kansas Infantry Regiment was a militia infantry regiment from Kansas that served in the Union Army between October 9 and October 29, 1864, during the American Civil War.

Service 
The regiment was called into service on October 9, 1864, to defend Kansas from Maj. Gen. Sterling Price and his men. After pursuing Price, the regiment provided border protection between Coldwater Grove to Fort Scott. On October 29, 1864, it was disbanded.

See also
 List of Kansas Civil War Units

References

Bibliography 
 Dyer, Frederick H. (1959). A Compendium of the War of the Rebellion. New York and London. Thomas Yoseloff, Publisher. .

Units and formations of the Union Army from Kansas
1864 establishments in Kansas
Military units and formations established in 1864
Military units and formations disestablished in 1864